Route 71 is a north–south state highway in Connecticut, running from Wallingford to West Hartford. It is the main north–south road of Meriden, Berlin and New Britain.

Route description

Route 71 begins at an intersection with US 5 in Wallingford.  After 0.23 miles, it joins Route 150 for a  wrong way concurrency through the Yalesville Underpass.  Route 71 resumes its northward course, entering Meriden and passing the east end of Route 70.  In the center of Meriden, Route 71 becomes a pair of one way sections as it intersects West Main Street.  While southbound traffic may continue from West Main Street onto Cook Avenue, northbound traffic must turn right onto Hanover Street, then left onto South Grove Street, and left onto West Main Street to continue.  Once reunited, Route 71 proceeds west on West Main Street before turning north onto Chamberlain Highway.  It then crosses I-691 at exit 5, with access to and from the west.  It then crosses into Berlin, passing the eastern end of Route 364 before turning northeast as the Chamberlain Highway becomes Route 71A.  In the Kensington section of town, it turns more northward, and intersects Route 372.  It then has a junction with SR 571, a limited access connector that provides access to Route 9 and Routes 71A and 372.  After the SR 571 overpass, Route 71 immediately enters New Britain as it passes by New Britain Stadium.  It then continues toward downtown, before meeting the east end of the Route 72 expressway as it intersects Route 9, with direct access to Route 9 south.  After the overpass, it intersects the west end of Route 174.  Continuing north, it intersects the west end of Route 175 before passing by Central Connecticut State University.  After turning northeast, it once again intersects Route 9 at exit 30.  After passing through a 0.18 mile portion of Farmington, and a 0.04 mile sliver of Newington, Route 71 enters West Hartford and becomes New Britain Avenue, where it turns east and has an interchange with, but does not cross, I-84 and US 6 at exit 40.  Access to and from I-84 west is provided by SR 535 (Ridgewood Road).  Shortly thereafter, Route 71 ends at South Main Street, as Route 173 south turns east onto New Britain Avenue to assume through traffic.

History
Route 71 was established in the 1932 state highway renumbering as a route between downtown New Britain and Hartford. In the 1920s, this was part of State Highway 113, which ran from Plainville via New Britain to Hartford. The Plainville to New Britain section became part of Route 72 (now Route 372) in 1932. In 1934, the route was modified at both ends. The northern end was truncated to end at the Colt Highway (U.S. Route 6A), roughly at the location of Exit 40 of I-84. The south end was extended to U.S. Route 5A in Meriden via Kensington along Chamberlain Highway, Bradley Avenue, and Hanover Road (former State Highway 178). In 1962, US 5A in Meriden was removed and Route 71 signed at I-84 south of West Main Street was relocated to the former US 5A alignment (Cook Avenue and Old Colony Road). In 1969, Route 71 was extended to its current northern end at Route 173 in West Hartford after US 6 was relocated to I-84 (US 6A became US 6 in the early 1940s).

Route 71 was once planned to be a freeway south from the planned southwestern Interstate 291 to the Route 72 freeway in 1961.  In 1963, the state increased the planned mileage by planning the freeway to travel further north of I-291 to the Cedar Ridge Connector/Old Route 9 (remnants of which are now SR 504).  The 1961 plan was built in 1986 as SR 506 but the rest of the Route 71 freeway was cancelled. In 1989, Route 9 became the southern terminus of the Route 71 freeway instead of the northern terminus.  Route 9 was newly constructed west to, and extended onto the existing Route 72 freeway near Berlin and onto SR 506.  The Route 72 designation was scaled back westward to the old interchange with SR 506.

Junction list

Route 71A

It begins as Chamberlain Highway at Route 71 in Berlin and heads northward along High Road, briefly overlapping Route 372. It continues into New Britain, where it becomes Kensington Avenue, and ends half a mile later at an intersection with Buell Street. The road continues beyond Buell Street as a local road. Route 71A originally extended further north to connect back to Route 71 but was truncated to its present end in 1995. Some signage for Route 71A still exists north of the official northern terminus.

References

External links

Connecticut Routes, Route 71A

071
Transportation in New Haven County, Connecticut
Transportation in Hartford County, Connecticut
U.S. Route 5